Daytona State College (DSC) is a public college with its main campus in Daytona Beach, Florida. DSC also has 6 smaller regional campuses throughout Volusia and Flagler counties. It is part of the Florida College System.

The college offers more than 100 certificate, associate and baccalaureate degree programs in fields such as healthcare, emergency services, business, education, hospitality, engineering, and technology. In addition to having standard classes at its main and regional campuses, DSC offers a number of fully online degree programs through its distance learning platform.

The college's sports teams compete in NJCAA Region 8 and the Mid-Florida Conference. DSC is accredited by the Southern Association of Colleges and Schools (SACS).

History
The Florida Legislature authorized Daytona Beach Junior College as one of Floridas first comprehensive colleges in 1957. Its three divisions – college credit, adult education, and the Mary Karl Vocational School – functioned as separate entities under Volusia County Schools, although they all were administered by the colleges president. Volusia County Community College was founded simultaneously as a school for African Americans; at its inception Daytona Beach was all-white (at the time there were no integrated colleges in the state). Following the Civil Rights Act of 1964, VCCC was closed in 1965, and its students were given the option of enrolling at Daytona Beach. Those who did found an unhospitable atmosphere, and while 450 students transferred in 1965-66, black enrollment in 1966-67 was under 100.

In 1968, the Florida Legislature combined Daytona Beach Junior Colleges divisions into a single administrative unit under a District Board of Trustees independent of Volusia County Schools. In 1971, the college was renamed Daytona Beach Community College. Besides the main campus in Daytona Beach, the college offers several regional campuses, located in DeLand, Deltona, New Smyrna Beach/Edgewater, and Flagler/Palm Coast, as well as the Advanced Technology College and News-Journal Center in Daytona Beach. 

Daytona Beach Community College became a four-year college in 2006, when it offered its first bachelor's degree, the Bachelor of Applied Science in Supervision and Management. In 2008, the college was renamed as Daytona Beach College, then a month later renamed as Daytona State College, reflecting its transition to a four-year institution offering workforce baccalaureate degrees. The college began offering Bachelor of Science in Education degrees in spring 2009, Bachelor of Science in Engineering Technology degrees in fall 2010, bachelors degrees in Nursing and Information Technology in January 2014, and the Bachelor of Science in Accounting in fall 2020.

Campuses

Main campus
The main campus of Daytona State College is located off International Speedway Boulevard in Daytona Beach, Florida, approximately  Northeast of Daytona International Speedway and  Northeast of Orlando. 
   

Aside from housing the primary administrative offices, the main campus is also home to the Southeast Museum of Photography at the Mori Hosseini College of Hospitality and Culinary Management, as well as a University of Central Florida (UCF) partnership center. In the 2022-2023 school year, the college opened its first student housing facility.

Regional campuses
In addition to the Daytona Beach campus, Daytona State College has several other campuses to service Volusia and Flagler counties. In Daytona Beach, there are two other campuses: the Advanced Technology Center, where several vocational programs are offered, and the News-Journal Center, which houses the college's performing arts venues and the Mike Curb College of Music, Entertainment, & Art.

Outside Daytona Beach, there are campuses in DeLand, Deltona, New Smyrna Beach, and Palm Coast. In addition to having standard classes at these campuses, DSC offers a number of fully online degree programs through its distance learning platform. 

DSC, in partnership with the University of Central Florida, participates in a program called DirectConnect. Through this program, all students and alumni of Daytona State College are assured admission to the university, though not necessarily to academic programs in the UCF colleges.

Athletics
The school's athletic teams compete in the Mid-Florida Conference of the Florida State College Activities Association, a body of the National Junior College Athletic Association Region 8.

Notable alumni

References

External links

 

 
Buildings and structures in Daytona Beach, Florida
Educational institutions established in 1957
Florida College System
Universities and colleges accredited by the Southern Association of Colleges and Schools
Universities and colleges in Volusia County, Florida
NJCAA athletics
1957 establishments in Florida